Proshkin is a Russian masculine surname, its feminine counterpart is Proshkina. It may refer to
Aleksandr Proshkin (born 1940), Russian film director and screenwriter
Vitali Proshkin (born 1976), Russian ice hockey defender

Russian-language surnames